Christ the King Parish is a Roman Catholic parish church in BF Homes, Caloocan, Philippines.

History

The Christ the King Parish was established on January 7, 1983, by Archbishop Jaime Cardinal Sin under the Columban Missionaries with Rev. Fr. John Leydon. Leydon was parish priest for 12 years. On March 12, 1995, the Columban turned over the leadership to the Diocese of Caloocan with the assignment of its first Filipino pastor, Rev. Fr. Jaime Z. Lara. Then, the Kaybiga and Bagbaguin areas of Caloocan were detached from the Parish resulting in the reorganization of the latter.

The Parish created seven sub-parishes: Sto. Kristo (Barangay Llano), Holy Family (Sunriser Subdivision), Mary Help of Christians (Silanganan Subdivision), St. Joseph the Worker (Dolmar Subdivision), Our Lady of La Naval (BF Homes III Deparo), and St. Martin de Pores (Cefels Subdivision).

Parish priests

Feast
The Parish celebrates its feast day every 3rd Sunday of November, coinciding with the Solemnity of Christ the King festivities in Catholic tradition.

References

External links 
 Christ the King Parish Facebook Page
 Diocese of Novaliches

Roman Catholic churches in Metro Manila
Buildings and structures in Caloocan